Ryan Riordon (born 1982) is a Canadian politician, who was elected to the Legislative Assembly of New Brunswick in the 2010 provincial election. He represented the electoral district of Nepisiguit as a member of the Progressive Conservatives until 2014, when he was defeated by Denis Landry in the redistributed riding of Bathurst East-Nepisiguit-Saint-Isidore.

References

1982 births
Progressive Conservative Party of New Brunswick MLAs
Living people
21st-century Canadian politicians